William Kendall (June 1916 – 27 August 2004) was an Australian swimmer. He competed in the men's 100 metre freestyle at the 1936 Summer Olympics, reaching the semi-finals but not the finals. During his semi-final Olympic swim, Kendall became the first Australian to break the one-minute barrier in his event with a time of 59.9 seconds, leaving him in 5th place in the semi-final and with a final placing in the event of 9th out of 45.

Kendall had been the Australian 100-yards champion in 1935, and was willing to finance his own trip to the 1936 Games were he not selected for the Olympic team.

References

External links
 

1916 births
2004 deaths
Olympic swimmers of Australia
Swimmers at the 1936 Summer Olympics
Sportspeople from Newcastle, New South Wales
Australian male freestyle swimmers
20th-century Australian people